Khaziman (Xajiman) is a rural locality (a village) in Sabayevsky Selsoviet, Buzdyaksky District, Bashkortostan, Russia. The population was 45 as of 2010. There are 2 streets.

Geography 
Khaziman is located 43 km north of Buzdyak (the district's administrative centre) by road. Novy Shigay is the nearest rural locality.

References 

Rural localities in Buzdyaksky District